Type 22 may refer to:

 Type 22 (radar) Japanese World War II radar
 Murata Type 22 rifle, a rifle of the Imperial Japanese Army
 Type 22 frigate, a Royal Navy frigate class.
 Type 22 missile boat, a People's Liberation Army Navy fast attack craft
 Type 22 pillbox, a British World War II defence structure

See also
Class 22 (disambiguation)